Federal Reserve Bank Building may refer to:
Federal Reserve Bank of Atlanta Birmingham Branch, Birmingham, Alabama
Federal Reserve Bank Building (Little Rock, Arkansas)
Federal Reserve Bank of San Francisco, Los Angeles Branch, Los Angeles, California
Federal Reserve Bank of San Francisco (San Francisco, California)
Federal Reserve Bank Building (Seattle)
Federal Reserve Bank of Richmond, Baltimore Branch, Baltimore, Maryland
 Federal Reserve Bank Building (Boston, Massachusetts)
Federal Reserve Bank of Chicago Detroit Branch Building, Detroit, Michigan
925 Grand, the former Federal Reserve Building in Kansas City, Missouri
Federal Reserve Bank of Kansas City, Kansas City, Missouri
Federal Reserve Bank of New York, New York, New York
Federal Reserve Bank of Cleveland, Cleveland, Ohio
Old Federal Reserve Bank Building (Philadelphia), Philadelphia, Pennsylvania
Federal Reserve Bank of Atlanta, Nashville, Tennessee
Eccles Building, Washington, D.C., home to the board of governors of the Federal Reserve System